The Scarlet Shadow is a 1919 American silent comedy film directed by Robert Z. Leonard and starring Mae Murray, Martha Mattox and Frank Elliott.

Cast
 Mae Murray as Elena Evans 
 Martha Mattox as Aunt Alvira Evans 
 Frank Elliott as Harvey Presby 
 Ralph Graves as Van Presby 
 Clarissa Selwynne as Edith Presby 
 Willard Louis as Joseph Fleming 
 J. Edwin Brown as The Gardner

References

Bibliography
 Michael G. Ankerich. Mae Murray: The Girl with the Bee-stung Lips. University Press of Kentucky, 2012.

External links
 

1919 films
1919 comedy films
1910s English-language films
American silent feature films
Silent American comedy films
Films directed by Robert Z. Leonard
American black-and-white films
Universal Pictures films
1910s American films